Syed Nazeer Niazi was an eminent Muslim scholar, professor and journalist. He was one of the leading activists of the Pakistan movement. He was James Boswell of Allama Iqbal. His biography of Iqbal, Iqbal kay Hazoor, and Maktoobat-e-Iqbal Banaam Nazir Niazi are basic sources for the study of Iqbal. During the last two years of Iqbal's life, he regularly visited him and recorded his conversation in his book "Iqbal Kai Hazoor". He completed this conversation in three volumes, but unfortunately the last two volumes were destroyed. Only first volume was published.

Early life

He got his early education from his uncle Shams-ul-Ulma (Grand Scholar) Syed Mir Hassan, Professor of Arabic and Persian language. Then he got his education from Maulana Aslam Jairajpuri.

He got married in a very honorable family and he had three sons and two daughters, currently living in Pakistan.

Career
He Joined Jamia Millia Islamia in 1922 and served here till 1935.
In 1927, he was appointed as Head of department of history of Islam. In 1946, he took the responsibilities of Information and Communications of Punjab Muslim League, and worked very hard for the Pakistan movement. He was awarded Pakistan Movement Gold Medal from government of Pakistan.

Translations and works

He had the honour of being the first translator of Sir Muhammad Iqbal's 1930 Presidential Address to the 25th Session of the All-India Muslim League Allahabad, 29 December 1930 into Urdu Language.

He was famous for his Urdu translation of The Reconstruction of Religious Thought in Islam, by Sir Muhammad Iqbal, and Politics.

Introduction to the History of Science

He also translated George Sarton “Introduction to the History of Science in  three-volume, 4,236-page, a work which reviews and catalogs the scientific and cultural contributions of every civilization from antiquity through the fourteenth century. According to Will Durant, "Every writer on Islamic science must record his debt to George Sarton for his Introduction to the History of Science That monumental work is not only one of the noblest achievements in the history of scholarship; it also performs an inestimable service in revealing the wealth and scope of Moslem culture. Scholars everywhere must hope that every facility will be provided for the completion of this work.".
This translation into Urdu language was published by Majlis Tariqi Adab in three volumes. The introduction written by him for this translation is itself a complete book on this subject.

His articles on Islamic concept of state in Muslim League journal "manshoor" published in Delhi in 1945 constitute an important historical material on this subject.

Tolu-e-Islam

In 1935, according to the instructions of Sir Muhammad Iqbal, He initiated and edited, a journal Tolu-e-Islam named after the famous poem of Sir Muhammad Iqbal, Tulu'i Islam. He also dedicated the first edition of this journal to Sir Muhammad Iqbal. His first article in this journal was "Millat Islamia Hind" The Muslim nation of India. This journal played an important part in the Pakistan movement.

Afterward, this journal was continued by Ghulam Ahmed Pervez, who had already contributed many articles in the early editions of this journal. He also named his movement as Tolu-e-Islam (Resurgence of Islam). This journal is still published by Idara Tolu-e-Islam. Initially, "Its primary object was to tell the people (of British India" that according to the Quran, ideology and not geographical boundary, was the basis for the formation of nation, and that a politically independent state was pre-requisite to live in Islam. For this it has to face not only the British and Hindu opposition but also the fanatic nationalism of Muslim individuals and groups such as represented by the Jamiat-ul-Ulema, Ahrar-e-Islam, etc.

After the emergence of Pakistan, the chief objective before (the journal) Tolu-e-Islam was to propagate the implementation of the principle which had inspired the demand for a separate Muslim state; that is, to help transform the live force of Islamic Ideology into the Constitution of Pakistan.

Tributes

"In an article, entitled ‘Conversations with Iqbal’, by Syed Nazir Niazi, a close friend of Iqbal, who has had extensive conversations with him, which he recorded from time to time, we have another treasure trove of information on Iqbal’s preoccupations with German culture and German thought. Again it is Goethe who figures most prominently in their conversations. Writes Niazi: ‘Perhaps what life needs most are men who can understand its ultimate purpose. Goethe was such a man and so was Iqbal. And it was Iqbal who turned our attention to Goethe. It is a remarkable episode in our history that Iqbal alone should have resisted the force of a whole literature and culture, namely English, which was dominating our life through political control. It is a fact that we accepted Goethe rather than Shakespeare. Shakespeare is no doubt admired, but Goethe is the favourite. Shakespeare is a unique artist whom we all recognize, but Goethe is one of us who has secured a place in our heart. If we bear this point in mind a glimpse of the perfect man or Vicegerent of God or Mu’min or Man of Faith and his character, disposition as conceived by Iqbal, is seen to some extent in Faust a creature of Goethe’s thoughts, and not for instance in the ‘Superman of Nietzsche."

"some very useful and interesting books giving relatively more in-depth biographical details on Iqbal were written by Iqbal scholars such as Faqir Syed Waheeduddin, Syed Nazeer Niazi,...in 1977 will be remembered as a watershed year as Iqbal centennial was commemorated at the government level that year, when the literary world witnessed an unprecedented flow of books and articles on Iqbal."

See also
 Sir Muhammad Iqbal.
 Ghulam Ahmed Pervez.
 Maulana Aslam Jairajpuri.
 Tulu'i Islam
 Tolu-e-Islam
 Jamia Millia Islamia
 George Sarton
 All-India Muslim League
 Pakistan movement

Sources

 Iqbal kay Hazoor, by Syed Nazeer Niazi
 Maktoobat -e- Iqbal Benam Nazeer Niazi. https://web.archive.org/web/20091201093645/http://www.iqbalcyberlibrary.net/Urdu-Books/969-416-207-021/
 Zinda Rud, 3 Volumes, by Justice Javed Iqbal. https://web.archive.org/web/20091201095110/http://www.iqbalcyberlibrary.net/Urdu-Books/969-416-207-008/

References

Muhammad Iqbal
Leaders of the Pakistan Movement
20th-century Muslim scholars of Islam
Islamic philosophers
People from Jalandhar
Pashtun people
Jamia Millia Islamia